Priotrochus goudoti is a species of sea snail, a marine gastropod mollusk in the family Trochidae, the top snails.

Description
The height of the shell attains 9 mm, its diameter 6 mm. The small, imperforate, thick shell has a conoid-elongated shape. It is whitish-ashen, punctate with rose-color, maculate with spadiceous. The 6 to 7 whorls 6 are convex. They are spirally cingulate, the penultimate whorls with 8 cinguli. The body whorl is elongated, rounded in the middle, appressed below the suture, convex beneath. The aperture is ovate-subquadrate. The lip is crenulated. The columella is arcuate and delicately crenulated.

Distribution
This species occurs in the Indian Ocean off Madagascar, the Comoros, and the Mascarene Basin.

References

 Herbert D.G. (1988). Studies on Priotrochus obscurus and the systematics position of Priotrochus (Mollusca: Gastropoda: Trochidae). Journal of zoology 214:561–268
 Herbert D.G. (1994). Trochus kotschyi, the first Indian Ocean record of the genus Osilinus (Mollusca: Gastropoda: Trochidae). Journal of Zoology 233:345–357.
 Herbert D.G. (1994). Notes on synonymy within the genus Priotrochus Fischer, 1879 (Prosobranchia: Trochidae). Annals of the Natal Museum 35:139–151

External links
 
 Fischer P. 1878. Diagnoses trochorum novorum. Journal de Conchyliologie, 26: 62-67
 Martens, E. von. (1880). Mollusken. Pp. 179-353, pl. 19-22 In K. Möbius, F. Richters & E. von Martens, Beiträge zur Meeresfauna der Insel Mauritius und der Seychellen. Berlin: Gutmann.

goudoti
Gastropods described in 1878